Gaia-X is a project reportedly working on the development of a federation of data infrastructure and service providers for Europe to ensure European digital sovereignty.
Gaia-X is part of a broader strategy under the von der Leyen Commission of European strategic autonomy.
The project was first presented to the general public at the Digital Summit 2019 in Dortmund (Germany) and has been continuously developed since then.
The Gaia-X initiative took the legal form of an AISBL, an international non-profit organization based in Belgium. Initiated by France and Germany, it seeks to create a proposal for the next generation of data infrastructure for Europe, as well as foster the digital sovereignty of European cloud service users. It is reportedly based on European values of transparency, openness, data protection, and security.
The name of the project bears reference to the Greek goddess Gaia.

Goals 

The reported objective of Gaia-X is to design the next generation of a federated European data infrastructure. To accomplish this it hopes to specify common requirements for a European data infrastructure and develop a reference implementation.
According to the German Federal Ministry of Economics and Energy (BMWi), openness, transparency and European connectivity are central to Gaia-X. The stated goal of this digital ecosystem is to ensure that companies and business models from Europe can be competitive. Reportedly, Gaia-X's objective is not to become a Cloud service provider or a Cloud management platform. The implementation of Gaia-X is described as not being intended to create a competing product to existing offers (e.g. hyperscalers). Instead, its stated aim is to link different elements via open interfaces and standards, in order to connect data and make them available to a broad audience. Gaia-X also reportedly seeks to enable the creation of different types of innovation platforms.

Solutions 

According to its own project statement, the project objectives are to be achieved by combining existing central and decentralised infrastructures to form a system which together form a "digital ecosystem". Characteristics of this ecosystem are:
 The use of secure, open technologies (see for example Open Source, Open Hardware),  
 Clearly identifiable Gaia-X nodes, 
 Software components from a common repository, 
 Standards based on common values and relevant regulations of the EU and its member states, 
 Uniform data and service room.

Gaia-X is said to offer the following added value from a data and infrastructure perspective: 
 It should enable a sovereign decision on data-based business models. 
 It is intended to support innovative cross-sector cooperation in order to aggregate and increase the value of data. 
 Fair and transparent business models should be promoted by providing rules and standards for cooperative approaches, including the legally compliant use of data. 
 Common models and rules for data monetization should reduce the complexity and costs of commercializing data.  
 Cross-industry cooperation to create federal, interoperable services will be facilitated.  
 Access to secure, trustworthy and modern IT infrastructures (automated services and API-controlled infrastructures), which increase productivity in software development, is to be facilitated.  
 The loss of company data is to be significantly reduced by recognising and maintaining protection classes and regulations on confidentiality when exchanging data.

Gaia-X Association AISBL 

Following an announcement in June 2020 that an international non-profit organisation, Gaia-X Association has been established in the form of an international non-profit association under Belgian law (in French: Association Internationale sans but lucratif, short: AISBL) with its headquarters in Brussels. The founding members on the German side include Beckhoff Automation, BMW, Bosch, DE-CIX, Deutsche Telekom, German Edge Cloud, Deutsche Telekom, PlusServer, SAP and Siemens. In addition, the Fraunhofer Gesellschaft, the International Data Spaces Association and the European cloud provider association CISPE are co-founders of the Gaia-X Association. On the French side, Amadeus, Atos, Docaposte, Électricité de France (EDF), Institut Mines-Télécom (IMT), Orange, Outscale, OVHcloud, Safran and Scaleway are among the French Founding Members. The development of the necessary components will also be pursued. It has also been revealed that controversial California-based company Palantir, part of the military-industrial complex of the US, was onboard GAIA-X since “day one”.

Gaia-X Hubs are set up at country level in order to animate the Gaia-X communities locally. Germany and France already have set up hubs. Netherlands, Belgium, Finland and Italy already announced during the Gaia-X Summit of November 2020 to be in the process to do so as well.

Structure of the organization 

The Gaia-X European Association for Data and Cloud AISBL is composed of 4 main bodies:
 The Board of Directors (BoD), which is elected by the General Assembly. Only organizations with worldwide headquarters in Europe can be elected to the Board. Board members are elected for 2-year terms. It is the decision-making body of the organization.
 The Policy Rules Committee (PRC), which appointed by the board of directors. The PRC defines the Policy Rules Document, which lays out rules to be fulfilled by members and services declared within Gaia-X to reflect the "European Values" of Gaia-X (Transparency, Data Protection, Portability, Security).
 The Technical Committee (TC), which is chaired by the CTO, which defines the
 mandatory Functional specifications.
 mandatory Technical specifications.
 mandatory Compliance specifications, being translated from the PRC.
 optional specifications for a reference implementation.

 The Data Space Business Committee (DSBC), which support the creation of data spaces around requirements of users of cloud services in vertical markets: Financial Services, Healthcare, Manufacturing, Space, Energy,etc. The DSBC has been added at a later stage.

Policy Rules 

Gaia-X's Policy Rules intend to identify clear controls to demonstrate European values of Gaia-X, such values including Openness, Transparency, Data Protection, Security and Portability.

Each and every service offering to be provided under the umbrella / via the Gaia-X framework shall comply with these requirements. The first version have been published in June 2020, and have been updated in April 2021, and November 2021.

Implementation 

A June 2020 publication describes the planned architecture.  On 12 January 2021, the Laboratory for Machine Tools and Production Engineering (WZL) of RWTH Aachen University in Germany announced the implementation of a secure, decentralized IoT data space based on the Gaia-X model. A total of 4 locations were connected, one of them by Fraunhofer IPT.

Senseering, WZL, Fraunhofer IPT and Fraunhofer FIT are also planning to establish a state-wide Gaia-X compliant IoT data space for the federal state of North Rhine-Westphalia (NRW) in Germany, the DataMarketPlace.NRW.

Political support 

Gaia-X has been initiated as a project by the German Minister of Economic Affairs and Energy Peter Altmaier, immediately supported by the French Minister of Economy Bruno Le Maire during the summer 2019.

A first common press release from Peter Altmaier and Bruno Le Maire was issued in October 2019.

A first Franco-German Position Paper was published February 18, 2020.

A specific joined press conference took place with both Ministers Peter Altmaier and Bruno Le Maire in June 2020 (source: programme), including the announcement on the Gaia-X Association AISBL by the 22 founding members. That announcement achieved a quite broad press coverage by well-known newswire and newspapers: Reuters, AFP, Politico, El Pais, Les Echos, Business Insider, TagesSpiegel, Europe1.

In September 2020, Ursula von der Leyen, the President of the European Commission, mentioned Gaia-X in her first State of the Union Address in front of the European Parliament, as a key building block of the European Digital Strategy.

Will Hutton, writing in The Guardian in October 2020, indicated that GaiaX is part of a wider strategy to tackle the abuse of personal privacy and monopoly status by USbased tech giants.

Controversies 
Early on in the Gaia-X project, open source software advocates have warned against corporate capture of Gaia-X by large companies. They referred to Gaia-X as a possible Trojan horse of big tech in Europe and compared Gaia-X to the French State sponsored cloud project Andromeda launched 10 years earlier and which resulted in public funds benefiting large non-European industry players.

In November 2021, one of the members of Gaia-X, the French cloud provider Scaleway announced that it is leaving the association. Other participants expressed doubts about the net benefits of the initiative.

Gaia-X has registered delays in its implementation due to infightings between its corporate members. Participants from companies and government have expressed disappointment with the project.

See also 

 Global Partnership on Artificial Intelligence
 Strategic autonomy

References

External links
Gaia-X Website

Organisations based in Belgium
Non-profit organisations based in Belgium
2019 establishments in Europe